Blaine Chad Woodson (born October 30, 1995) is an American professional Canadian football defensive lineman who is currently a free agent. He was signed by the San Francisco 49ers of the National Football League (NFL) as an undrafted free agent in 2018 after playing college football for Delaware. He spent parts of training camp with the 49ers and Cleveland Browns in 2018 before signing with the Ottawa Redblacks of the Canadian Football League (CFL).

External links
Delaware Fightin' Blue Hens football bio

1995 births
Living people
American football defensive linemen
Canadian football defensive linemen
Delaware Fightin' Blue Hens football players
San Francisco 49ers players
Cleveland Browns players
Ottawa Redblacks players
American players of Canadian football
Players of American football from Pennsylvania